Nancy Ann Travis (born September 21, 1961) is an American actress.

She began her career on Off-Broadway theater, before her first leading screen role in the ABC television miniseries Harem opposite Omar Sharif. Her breakthrough came in 1987, playing Sylvia Bennington in the comedy film Three Men and a Baby. She later starred in its sequel, Three Men and a Little Lady (1990).

Travis has starred in many films, including Internal Affairs (1990), Air America (1990), Passed Away (1992), Chaplin (1992), So I Married an Axe Murderer (1993), Greedy (1994), and Fluke (1995). On television, Travis went on to star in the CBS sitcom Almost Perfect in 1995, which ran two seasons, and in the short-lived Work with Me (1999). In 2002, she played a leading role in the ABC miniseries Rose Red, and later joined the cast of the CBS sitcom Becker for its final two seasons.

From 2011 to 2021, Travis starred as Vanessa Baxter in the ABC/Fox sitcom Last Man Standing. From 2018 to 2019, she also starred opposite Michael Douglas in the Netflix comedy series The Kominsky Method.

Early life 
Travis was born in Queens, the daughter of Theresa, a social worker, and Gordon Travis, a sales executive. Travis was raised in Framingham, Massachusetts, and Baltimore, Maryland. She was raised Catholic.

Career 
Travis's first job after graduating from high school was in a play, It's Hard to Be a Jew, at The American Jewish Theatre in NYC. After that, Travis appeared in a stage version of Neil Simon's Brighton Beach Memoirs and was a founding member of the Off-Broadway theater company Naked Angels. She appeared in their Frank Pugliese play Aven U-Boys, as well as in King of Connecticut. She made her Broadway debut in I'm Not Rappaport. She starred in Athol Fugard's My Children, My Africa.

Travis has had roles in many films, including Three Men and a Baby and its sequel, Three Men and a Little Lady, plus Air America and Internal Affairs (as the wife of Andy García's character), So I Married an Axe Murderer, as the bride of Mike Myers' character, thriller The Vanishing with Kiefer Sutherland, Greedy with Michael J. Fox, and in the action-comedy Destiny Turns on the Radio with Dylan McDermott. Other notable films include the 1995 box office bomb Fluke, 1996 Whoopi Goldberg's comedy Bogus, political comedy/drama Running Mates with Three Men and a Baby co-star Tom Selleck, 2001 drama film Auggie Rose, 2005 comedy The Sisterhood of the Traveling Pants and 2007 ensemble cast romantic drama The Jane Austen Book Club adapted from the 2004 novel of the same name by Karen Joy Fowler. She was featured in Chaplin opposite Robert Downey Jr., portraying Joan Barry, the woman who filed a paternity suit against Chaplin.

Travis starred with Peter Gallagher and Isabella Rossellini in the Tom Cruise-directed episode of the Showtime series Fallen Angels in 1993. From 1995 to 1997, Travis played a leading role in the CBS sitcom Almost Perfect. The show was canceled after two seasons. In 1999 she starred in the short-lived TV series Work with Me, Travis was also a producer. Due to low ratings, the show was cancelled after four episodes.

Travis had the leading role of psychology professor Dr. Joyce Reardon in 2002's four-hour television adaptation of Stephen King's Rose Red. In 2002, Travis joined the cast of the CBS sitcom Becker as Chris Connor. She starred in the show for its final two seasons, replacing the series' original female lead, Terry Farrell. From 2007 to 2009 Travis appeared in the television sitcom The Bill Engvall Show as Bill's wife Susan. In 2009 she starred in the Hallmark Channel film Safe Harbor, about a happily married couple, Doug (Treat Williams) and Robbie Smith (Travis) about to retire and spend their days cruising the world on their sailboat. In 2010, she starred in TV films The Pregnancy Pact, In My Shoes and was a guest star in two episodes of Desperate Housewives. In 2011, she guest starred in the television series Grey's Anatomy and How I Met Your Mother.

In 2011, Travis was cast in the ABC sitcom Last Man Standing opposite Tim Allen. Travis also was cast in the same time in The CW medical drama series Hart of Dixie as Emmeline "Mrs. H" Hattenbarger, but due to her commitments with the 20th Century Fox-produced Last Man Standing left the show after two episodes. Last Man Standing was canceled in 2017, after six seasons and 130 episodes, but was revived by Fox in the fall of 2018. The show debuted on September 28, 2018, and had its highest rating since season two. The series ended in 2021 after 194 episodes.

From 2017 to 2018, Travis played Brendan Gleeson's ex-wife in the crime thriller series Mr. Mercedes. In 2018, Travis was cast as a female lead opposite Michael Douglas and Alan Arkin in the Netflix comedy series The Kominsky Method, created by Chuck Lorre. In 2022, she returned to film, starring opposite Hilary Swank in the drama Ordinary Angels directed by Jon Gunn. She next was cast in the Hallmark Channel Neo-Western drama series Ride playing the role of Isabel McMurray, the family matriarch.

Personal life 
In 1994, Travis married Robert N. Fried, the former president and CEO of Savoy Pictures and Founder and former CEO of Hallmark Movies Now (formerly known as SpiritClips and FeeIn). They have two sons: Benjamin E., and Jeremy. She starred in the 2007 short film Sally, featuring Benjamin and written by her husband.

Filmography

Film

Television

References

External links 
 
 

1961 births
20th-century American actresses
21st-century American actresses
Actresses from New York City
American film actresses
American Roman Catholics
American stage actresses
American television actresses
American voice actresses
Circle in the Square Theatre School alumni
Living people
People from Queens, New York